Low-volatility investing is an investment style that buys stocks or securities with low volatility and avoids those with high volatility. This investment style exploits the low-volatility anomaly. According to financial theory risk and return should be positively related, however in practice this is not true. Low-volatility investors aim to achieve market-like returns, but with lower risk. This investment style is also referred to as minimum volatility, minimum variance, managed volatility, smart beta, defensive and conservative investing.

History 
The low-volatility anomaly was already discovered in the early 1970s, yet it only became a popular investment style after the 2008 global financial crises. The first tests of the Capital Asset Pricing Model (CAPM) showed that the risk-return relation was too flat. Two decades later, in 1992 the seminal study by Fama and French clearly showed that market beta (risk) and return were not related when controlling for firm size. Fisher Black argued that firms or investors could apply leverage by selling bonds and buying more low-beta equity to profit from the flat risk-return relation. In the 2000s more studies followed, and investors started to take notice. In the same period, asset managers such as Acadian, Robeco and Unigestion started offering this new investment style to investors. A few years later index providers such as MSCI and S&P started to create low-volatility indices.

Performance 

This investment style is slowly becoming accepted, as many low-volatility strategies have been able to deliver good real-life performance. Several low-volatility strategies have existed for more than 10 years. Most academic studies and most low-volatility indices are based on simulations. Some studies go back 90 years and show that low-volatility stocks beat high-volatility stocks over the very long run (see image). Since low-volatility securities tend to lag during bull markets and tend to reduce losses in bear markets, a full business cycle is needed to assess performance. Over a shorter time period like one year, Jensen's alpha is useful to calculate performance. This performance metric corrects the performance of for market beta risk. For example, when a low-volatility strategy has a beta of 0.7 and the market is up by 10% the expected return is 7%. Lower risk should give lower return. If the actual return is 10%, then Jensen’s alpha is 3%.

Criticism 
Any investment strategy might become ineffective over time if its popularity causes its advantage to be arbitraged away. That could also be the case for low-volatility investing, and some point to the high valuations of low-volatility stocks in the late 2010s. Still, David Blitz showed that hedge funds are at the other side of the low-volatility trade, despite their ability to use leverage. Others state that low-volatility is related to the well-known value investing style. For example, after the dotcom bubble, value stocks offered protection similar to low volatility stocks. Finally, low-volatility stocks also tend to have more interest rate risk compared to other stocks. 2020 was a challenging year for US low volatility stocks since they significantly lag the broad market by wide margins. The criticism and discussions are found mainly in the various academic financial journals, but investors take notice and also contribute to this debate.

See also 

 Low-volatility anomaly
 Investment style / Style investing
 Value investing
 Momentum investing

Further reading 
A couple of books have been written about low-volatility investing:  

 Eric Falkenstein, Wiley 2011, Finding Alpha: The search for alpha when risk and return break down. 
 Peter Sander, McGraw-Hill 2013, All about low-volatility investing. . 
 Eric Falkenstein, 2016, The Missing Risk Premium: Why low-volatility investing works.   
 Pim van Vliet, Jan de Koning, Wiley 2016, High Returns from Low Risk: A Remarkable Stock Market Paradox. .

References 

Investment